Blue Veins may refer to:

"Blue Veins", a song by The Raconteurs on their 2006 album Broken Boy Soldiers
Blue Veins (Pakistan), a women's health advocacy group
Blue Veins (TV series), a 2016 Hong Kong vampire series

See also
Blue Vein, a hamlet in Wiltshire, England